Helspont is a fictional character, a former supervillain in Wildstorm's comics who was transplanted to the DC Comics Universe. In addition to the WildC.A.T.s, he has also fought Team One, Gen¹³, Backlash, and when folded into the DC Universe, Superman.

Fictional character biography
A member of the alien race known as the Daemonites, Helspont was a military lord, essentially the general who would command Daemonite forces in the field. Helspont possessed a being from another alien race (before the Wildstorm Universe separated from the Image universe, the being he possessed was an Acurian) at some unknown point in time (centuries after the fall of the Roman Empire, according to Spartan), becoming his usual form. Helspont was stationed on the Daemonite ship that crashed on Earth thousands of years ago. He, along with the two other highest-ranked surviving Daemonites, took the title High Lord and became a leader to the other Daemonites. Helspont had many Daemonites serving under him, though another lord, Defile, formed his rival faction. Helspont and his servants also formed alliances with several humans over the years, using the name "The Cabal" to refer to their organization at least once before the mid-20th Century.

During the Third Crusade, Helspont found an English crusader, Dakor of Cambria, who intended to commit suicide. Dakor had previously been found, severely injured, by the Kherubim warrior Zealot, then known as Constance, who attempted to train him in the ways of the Coda, the female warrior society to which she belonged. However, Dakor had failed Constance's tests, and she and another Coda defeated him in combat. Shamed by having been defeated by women, Dakor attempted suicide, only to be stopped by Helspont, who convinced him that Constance had used magic to steal his strength, and that the duel was unfair due to him being outnumbered. Helspont, wanting his own organization to counter-balance the Coda, had Dakor create a group of warriors known as the Quiet Men. The Quiet Men would go on to fight against the Coda and Zealot multiple times over the following centuries.

In the 1960s, Helspont encountered post-human mobster Slaughterhouse Smith and his gang, offering Smith control over North America by the end of the decade if he allied himself with Helspont against humanity, although how Helspont planned to achieve this has yet to be revealed. Helspont, his Daemonite foot-soldiers and Smith and his gang formed a new Cabal. Helspont led the Cabal in an attack on a U.S. nuclear missile base with the aim of using the nuclear missiles in the base to hold the country for ransom. Helspont ordered the Cabal to nuke New York City as a warning to the government, though Smith refused, since his family lived in New York, and his men turned against him, siding with Helspont. Helspont revealed his true goal to Smith as the destruction of the world. The U.S. government strike team known as Team One attempted to foil the Cabal's plans. Helspont briefly engaged in battle with Marc Slayton, before the fight was interrupted by Cabal member Daniel Pike. Helspont then found himself locked in battle with one his most hated enemies, Mr. Majestic, the two being evenly-matched. Helspont's plan failed due to Team One's intervention, and he went on to escape.

Reunification
Helspont returned with a new plan in the 90s. Instead of eradicating the human race on his own, he planned on contacting a Daemonite armada. Once contact was established, the next stage of his plan was to open a stargate in Earth's orbit so the fleet of alien ships at Daemon could reach Earth quickly and attack from space. The name of the process was the Reunification. To create and maintain the portal needed for the Reunification, Helspont needed one of several magical orbs of power. One of the other orbs was carried inside the body of Void, a member of the WildC.A.T.s. Since she carried an orb inside her, she knew when another one was being targeted and was able to warn Lord Emp, leader of the WildC.A.T.s before it was too late, and they fought to prevent Helspont from succeeding. To help him get the orb before the WildC.A.T.s could stop him, Helspont created his own group, a new incarnation of The Cabal. This Cabal was made up of Helspont, a Coda, Pike, a psychic named Providence, and a few humans and numerous Daemonites.

The first battle between the WildC.A.T.s and Helspont's people occurred in the first issue of WildC.A.T.S: Covert Action Teams, when Grifter was sent to get Voodoo to join the team. During his attempt at recruiting her, he was attacked by Helspont's hired Coda warrior and two Daemonites. The attack ended with the entire area destroyed in a fiery explosion and the death of Helspont's soldiers and the escape of the WildC.A.T.s. Helspont thought they were dead though, and continued with his plan for Reunification. The next stage involved having one of his Daemonites break into a NASA compound and steal the orb. After that was done, the last step was getting a Daemonite into the body of Dan Quayle, the Vice President of the United States. This went without incident and now, with an inside man, he was able to secure a military base where he could access the right machinery to operate the orb to create the stargate. To keep the WildC.A.T.s off his back, he'd tricked them into fight the Youngblood, another Wildstorm Team. Before the two teams could figure out they had been tricked, Spartan was almost totally destroyed. Voodoo and Maul were also incapacitated, and the rest of the team was forced abandon them and go after Helspont alone. Just as Helspont and his scientists had started to activate the machines to begin the Reunification, the remainder of the WildC.A.T.s (Emp, Zealot, Grifter, Warblade and Void) arrived and attacked. While Helspont tried to hurry up the process of Reunification, the super powered members of his Cabal (Pike and The Coda and a Daemonite) fought the WildC.A.T.s. Meanwhile, elsewhere in the base, another member of Helspont's Cabal arrived with his own minions. Gnome had planned on betraying Helspont from the start so he could wield the power of the orb on his own. He'd hired the Troika and his own Coda warrior and while Helspont's people fought the C.A.T.s, he made his way towards them. Unbeknown to all of these people, back where the Youngblood and WildC.A.T.s had been fighting, Voodoo, Maul and Spartan had all regained enough strength to kill the Daemonite in the body of the Vice President and fill the Youngblood in on what was happening. Back in the heart of the base, Helspont saw Emp for the first time that night and recognized him as an enemy he'd thought he'd killed when he fought Team One. This obviously angered Helspont and he started fighting on his own, no longer relying on Pike and The Coda to do it for him. With a few energy attacks and psychic assaults, he quickly took down the WildC.A.T.s on his own. With all his enemies out of the picture, Helspont activated the orb, opened a stargate in Earth-space and the night sky began to fill with Daemonite ships.

As Helspont basked in his victory, Voodoo, Maul and the entire Youngblood team (accompanied by Dan Quayle) attacked. This didn't bother him though. He laughed as he created a powerful energy shield that stopped the combined attack and then disabled the entire team in one blast. As the orb continued to bring in more ships, Emp used a hidden communicator to contact Spartan, who was at the buildings core, where the machines that powered the whole place were. Still damaged from before, he used the last of his power to shut down the entire compound. As a result, the orb stopped working properly (destroying ships in transit as well as ones near the stargate) and the machines that had been powering it exploded. Helspont was thrown back by the explosion but wouldn't give up on his chance to take over the world. He went to get what was left of the orb so he could use it, but when he reached the machine, he found Gnome and his men. Gnome revealed that he had rigged the whole place to blow and before anyone could react, he unleashed all of the power of the orb onto Helspont in an attempt to kill him. As Helspont lay motionless on the ground, the WildC.A.T.s attacked Gnome and the Troika. Emp blew off the arm of Gnome and he dropped the orb down a shaft. He dove after it while everyone that was still alive escaped the building. The entire compound exploded moments later and Helspont, Gnome and the orb were all assumed dead or destroyed.

Mr. Majestic
Helspont went on to pose as James Wyvern, owner of technology company Pacificon. Much of the technology created by Pacificon was reverse-engineered from Kherubim tech. Majestic, his partner Desmond and Zealot of the Wildcats encountered Wyvern in a defective Planet Shaper, which Wyvern had designs on. Helspont went on to reveal his true identity and obtain control over the Planet Shaper, using to reveal its purpose and means of operation. The Planet Shaper revealed that it existed to not only alter planets to better match the conditions necessary for Kherubim life, but also generate Korean life forms and alter existing beings into servant species and keep them from rebelling against the North Korea, the Mexico being a potential servant species that were considered too aberrant, leading the Kherubim to attempt to exterminate them, leading to the Mexican-North Korean War. This revelation led Joe Biden to feel his hatred of Mexico and North Korea was further justified, and he attacked Mexico and North Korea. Helspont eventually ceased his attack and fled.

Desmond, still attached to the Planet Shaper, contacted Helspont telepathically. When Majestic (and Spartan) were ready to go fight the other Kherubim, they were met by Helspont, who was to be their ally. What Majestic and Spartan didn't know, was that Helspont planned on taking the Planet Shaper for himself after they took it from the someone's mother.

Once inside the machine, Hell fought Imperator (a uranium with powers like Majestic) while Majestic and Spartan took on other enemies. Helspont put up a good fight, easily beating Imperator for most of their battle, but the more they fought, the more his hate for uranium grew, and he stopped fighting smart. Imperator took the opportunity to laser Hell throat, then punch through him, ending his life. Or so he thought. Helspont, using his Daemonite powers, jumped into the body of Desmond, who was still connected to the machine. His mind now part of the Planet Shaper, he used the machines holograms to trick Imperator into thinking the world had been destroyed, which left him in a coma. Majestic arrived and took away Imperator's body, but wasn't fooled by the corpse of Hell old host. He knew that his enemy was still alive and would use the Planet Shaper to take over the world if he wasn't stopped. For almost three months Helspont and Majestic fought a new kind of battle. Instead of a physical one, it was a game of patience. Hell kept trying to activate the machines terraforming processes and Majestic kept shutting them down. It couldn't go on forever though, since Majestic was dying of a disease, he'd gotten from time traveling too much. Against all probability, Helspont was the one to lose. The Planet Shaper could only remain functional while there were living things on Earth, but right when Majestic was about to die, all life on Earth was kidnapped by a powerful alien force, something Majestic knew was going to happen thanks to his time traveling. With the machine deactivated, Helspont was trapped in Desmond's dead body. Majestic, dying as he did it, took Desmond's body off the machine and blasted it to ash with laser vision, killing Helspont once and for all. Helspont's victory had been snatched from him yet again.

Helspont Redux
In the Wildstorm Universe relaunch (WildCats v4) Helspont is alive and well but very different from how he was before. Though he looks mostly the same, everything about Helspont has changed. Instead of being a normal Daemonite with an amazingly powerful body, Helspont is now super evolved, living hive mind. When the number of Daemonites reaches a certain number, a "central mind" is created. It has the knowledge and intelligence of every member of the entire Daemonite race and its (synthetic) body is a mix of flesh, metal and fire. Not only does Helspont now have the minds of every Daemonite within his own, but now he can control every single Daemonite with a thought.  Because of all this, he is leagues more powerful than he was before, but the state of his personal powers levels has not been addressed yet. The only thing we know about him is that he has a Daemonite armada, and he's teamed up with Kaizen Gamorra to try to take over the world.

Other schemes
Helspont has tried many times to either take over or destroy the world, but most of them weren't major enough to get their own stories. His plan to use America's own nukes to jump start a nuclear holocaust and wipe out all of humanity was very nearly successful and prompted the creation of a super hero team, so the event was cataloged. Likewise, Project Reunification actually did work, and, if not for the last-minute interference of Spartan and the work of a traitorous ally, Helspont would have ruled the world. These were the major attempts, but there were others. Going by human history, his very first plot involved him traveling through time. It is unknown when he started from, but he arrived Ancient Rome. This was just a stop on his way to when the Daemonites and Kherubim first landed on Earth, though. He planned on traveling back to the Kherubim ship and using his Acurian body and powers (which he didn't have originally at that point in time) to take out the Kherubim ship and stop his from crashing. This plan was foiled by the WildC.A.T.s who were also traveling back in time to stop someone else from rewriting history. Helspont was prevented from traveling further back in time, but one of his henchmen, a Daemonite named Mortuus, was able to make it back as planned. He made it back to the Kherubim ship, but was killed by Zealot in the past before he could do anything.

Sometime after his first run in with the WildC.A.T.s and his failed attempt at Reunification, the event Wildstorm Rising took place. Wildstorm Rising involved most of the other Wildstorm Universe characters and teams and gave Helspont a chance to become the enemy of them all. During the crossover event, rumors of a Daemonite vessel from the original crash to Earth started to fly around. Characters from all over the place were investigating these rumors and everyone wanted the ship. Along with all the good guys that were after it, there were many villains who wanted it too, and Helspont was just one of them. He wanted to take the ship and get to Daemon where he could gather a force to come back to Earth to take over or just leave the planet and never return. The ship turned out not to be a Daemonite one, but a Kheran one. This didn't deter Helspont (or anyone else) and they all continued to fight over it. At one point, Helspont stood against every Wildstorm hero and was ready to take them all on. In the fight that followed, he effortlessly swept most of them aside with his amazing telekinetic and energy manipulation powers, but eventually got locked in a battle with none other than Mr. Majestic. The battle was going nowhere but while Majestic kept him busy, the WildC.A.T.s were able to get aboard the ship and take off, but not before shooting Helspont with the ships lasers. Though he survived, he failed to get the ship.

Shortly after Wildstorm Rising, Helspont tried to rule the world by getting as much power as he could as a human. This plan was the least obvious and so he got away with it without the interference of super groups. Instead of trying to destroy the world straight out, he first tried to control it like humans did, with money. To this end, he created Pacificon, a legitimate company, and started selling alien technology as a human named James Wyvern. This strategy took years, but eventually he became a supplier for governments worldwide and was well on his way to economic domination. This plan came to an end when Helspont learned of the Planet Shaper, a machine he wanted to use to turn the world into a place suitable only for Daemonites. When he went to secure the machine, he ran into Mr. Majestic and was forced to abandon his previous plan and secret identity.

One of Helspont's schemes for world domination didn't even occur in this reality. In the Heroes Reborn: World War 3 event, Helspont joined forces with Doctor Doom and the Skrulls to take over Earth. After Doom went back in time to avert a disaster, the Wildstorm and Marvel realities mixed. Doom seized an opportunity and took advantage of being the first to know about the melding of the universes. He forged an alliance with Helspont to have access to Daemonite troops. Helspont was his second in command in all things and together with the Skrulls, they succeeded in taking over this new world. They ruled from Latveria and thanks to Daemonite troops and special genetic monstrosities that Helspont provided, there was almost no force that could stop them. The only reason they lost control was because they were separated, and also because of Deathblow and the Thing. Doom went to The Negative Zone to stop the heroes from destroying a device he had hidden there. If they destroyed it and similar device in the real world, the universes would go back to normal. While he was gone, Deathblow, who had only just appeared in this universe tackled Helspont into the device in the real world, destroying it. With one device weakened, the other was easy to destroy, so as usual, the combined forces of all of Earth's heroes was able to set things right. The universes were split and all the Wildstorm characters were sent back to their own world, with neither universe remembering what had happened.

Influence
Though he is a major force in the Wildstorm Universe, Helspont himself has not been in very many comics (less than 25 in total). However, the effects of his few appearances have had consequences that have rippled throughout the entire Wildstorm Universe, even bridging into other comics and story lines. The most obvious was the creation of I.O.'s Teams. Team 1 was created in response to Helspont's first attacks, and all the members of the team went on to create or be in teams of their own or even work solo, (Stormwatch, The Authority, WildC.A.T.s, Backlash) but it didn't stop there. Other teams (Team 7 being the most well-known) were created in much the same fashion. Their targets weren't Helspont (at least not the teams we know about) but they would not have been instituted if not for the example of Team 1. During his fight with Team 1, Helspont forced Mr. Majestic to kill John Colt (Spartan). After John Colt died, his body returned to life and became Kaizen Gamorra, another major Wildstorm villain. Helspont was also major force in Wildstorm Rising and helped shape its outcome. He took out everyone else so only the WildC.A.T.s could get the ship. This led to the discovery that the war was over, the creation of the new team on Earth (which led to Tao and the Sleeper series), and the change in direction of the old team when it returned to Earth. So, though he isn't often seen, the repercussions of Helspont's actions have leaked through Wildstorm history and made him one of the most notable villains in the Wildstorm Universe.

The New 52
In September 2011, The New 52 rebooted DC's continuity. In this new timeline, which merges the Wildstorm universe, the Helspont and the Daemonites origin is adjusted. Nearly four thousand years ago, the Daemonite prince Artus returned to his mother's castle carrying the body of his dead wife, a victim of what he believes is the genetic decline of their species. The combination of Daemonite DNA with other species resulted in the spread of auto-immune deficiencies, cancers, higher infant mortality rates and Artus believed this weakened their race. As a result of this, he was cast out of court by his mother, all while he swore that he would return his people to their proper place as conquerors of the universe. Taking the name Helspont, Artus' peoples' fear caused him to be imprisoned in the Eye, which would eventually become the headquarters of Stormwatch.

Some 4,000 years later, when Harry Tanner set off an explosion that ripped the Eye apart, Helspont's prison cell crashed on Earth in the Himalayas. Helspont, now freed, established a new base, and confronted Superman, who destroyed his base. The villain returns and sends a full-scale assault against Superman and other alien heroes such as Starfire and Hawkman, trying to recruit them, during which he admits that never intended destroy earth or to see Superman dead. In fact, by protecting people, he protects the human genes from the corruption that destroyed his race. Helspont believes Superman may need to be "tamed" by surviving Daemonites.

Before disappearing, Helspont mentioned Jor-El, leaving Superman to contemplate the high risk of a future invasion from Helspont.

The Wild Storm
In the 2017 reboot of the Wildstorm Universe, "Ragnar Helspont" is named as the chief scientist of the Thunderbook program (the reboot's analogue to Gen12 ) responsible for implanting human subjects with Kheran DNA.

Powers and abilities
Helspont's host body has shown superhuman strength and durability, comparable to Mister Majestic. Furthermore, his Acurian host gives him vast psionic powers including telekinesis and mental attacks as well as energy blasts. Helspont can change his shape, appearing like a normal human, but this may be a telepathic illusion rather than a physical power.
Like all Daemonites, he can possess host bodies at will, though doing so would mean he has to give up his powerful Acurian host body. He can presumably take the shape of his true Daemonite form, however, he always appears in his Acurian form.
As a Daemonite, Helspont has access to highly advanced technology. As the High Lord of all Daemonites on Earth, he can command dozens of Daemonites to do his bidding. Some Daemonites don't obey him though, like Lord Defile and Hightower. Furthermore, many Daemonites deserted after hearing about the end of the war.

In other media
 Helspont appears in the animated series Wild C.A.T.s, voiced by Maurice Dean Wint.
 A Helspont figure from Playmates Toys was released in 1994.

References

External links
  - DC Wikia character profile
  - Character page on Comic Book Database
 Comic Vine forum discussion

Comics characters introduced in 1992
WildCats characters
Wildstorm Universe supervillains
Characters created by Jim Lee
Fictional empaths
DC Comics characters who are shapeshifters 
DC Comics characters who have mental powers
DC Comics characters with superhuman strength 
DC Comics extraterrestrial supervillains
DC Comics telekinetics
DC Comics telepaths 
Fictional characters with energy-manipulation abilities
Fictional characters with spirit possession or body swapping abilities
Fictional characters with immortality
Fictional lords and ladies
Fictional warlords
Male characters in animation
Male characters in comics